Nicosan, also known as Hemoxin, Niprisan, or Nix-0699, is a phytochemical which was studied in sickle-cell disease (SCD). As of 2017 it does not appear to be commercially available, as the only manufacturer, which was is in Nigeria, has stopped making it due to financial problems.

Medical uses
There is tentative evidence that it may be useful in sickle-cell disease. It however does not appear to affect overall complications or rates of anemia.

Chemistry
It is an ethanol/water extract of Piper guineense seeds, Pterocarpus osum stem, Eugenia caryophyllus fruit, and Sorghum bicolor leaves.

History
It was developed at the Nigerian National Institute for Pharmaceutical Research and Development (NIPRD) (U.S. Patent # 5,800,819 - September 1, 1998). NIPRD is conducted a Phase III clinical trials in Nigeria which showed unclear benefit but have not been published as of 2010.

In August 2002, a Nigerian subsidiary of the American company Xechem International, acquired the rights to Nicosan. On July 6, 2006, the drug was announced in Nigeria, with the president of Nigeria, Olusegun Obasanjo, in attendance.
In 2008, a fraud complaint alleged Nigerian public money was spent on the drug. Xechem International went bankrupt in 2008 and production of the drug stopped.

Footnotes

Antioxidants